Sentinel Spire is a 5,500-foot-elevation (1,700-meter) sandstone pillar located in Colorado National Monument, in Mesa County of western Colorado, United States. It is also immediately south of Window Rock, and north of another climbing destination, Pipe Organ, both of which can be seen from viewpoints along Rim Rock Drive. The first ascent of the summit was made May 3, 1960, by Layton Kor, Harvey Carter, and John Auld via the  route, Fast Draw. This was the day before the climbers also made the first ascent of nearby Kissing Couple. The first solo ascent was made by Ron Olevsky in March 1976, and the first free ascent was made by Andy Petefish and John Christenson in 1978. Some climbers refer to Sentinel Spire as Watusi Spear.

Geology
This tower is composed primarily of cliff-forming Wingate Sandstone, which consists of wind-borne, cross-bedded quartzose sandstones deposited as ancient sand dunes approximately 200 million years ago in the Late Triassic. The slope around the base of Sentinel Spire is Chinle Formation. The floor of the canyon is Precambrian basement rock consisting of gneiss, schist, and granites. Precipitation runoff from this geographical feature drains to the Colorado River, approximately 1.5 miles to the northeast.

Climate
According to the Köppen climate classification system, Sentinel Spire is located in a semi-arid climate zone. Summers are hot and dry, while winters are cold with some snow. Temperatures reach  on 5.3 days,  on 57 days, and remain at or below freezing on 13 days annually. The months April through October offer the most favorable weather to visit.

Climbing
Established rock climbing routes at Sentinel Spire:

 Fast Draw –  – 2 pitches – First ascent 1960
 Medicine Man  – class 5.12c – 4 pitches
 Vision Quest – class 5.11+ – 2 pitches

See also
 List of rock formations in the United States

References

External links
 Weather forecast: National Weather Service
 Sentinel Spire rock climbing: Mountainproject.com
 Sentinel Spire photo: Flickr

Colorado Plateau
Landforms of Mesa County, Colorado
Colorado National Monument
North American 1000 m summits
Sandstone formations of the United States
Rock formations of Colorado
Climbing areas of Colorado